The Itaipu Dam is a hydroelectric dam on the Paraná River located on the border between Brazil and Paraguay. It is the third largest hydroelectric dam in the world, and holds the 45th largest reservoir in the world.

The name "Itaipu" was taken from an isle that existed near the construction site. In the Guarani language,  means "the sounding stone". The Itaipu Dam's hydroelectric power plant produced the second-most electricity of any in the world as of 2020,  only surpassed by the Three Gorges Dam plant in electricity production.

The project ranges from Foz do Iguaçu, in Brazil, and Ciudad del Este in Paraguay, in the south to Guaíra and Salto del Guairá in the north. In 2016, the plant employed 3038 workers.

Of the twenty generator units currently installed, ten generate at 50 Hz for Paraguay and ten generate at 60 Hz for Brazil.

History

Negotiations between Brazil and Paraguay 
The concept behind the Itaipu Power Plant was the result of serious negotiations between the two countries during the 1960s. The "Ata do Iguaçu" (Iguaçu Act) was signed on July 22, 1966, by the Brazilian and Paraguayan Ministers of Foreign Affairs, Juracy Magalhães and Raúl Sapena Pastor, respectively. This was a joint declaration of the mutual interest in studying the exploitation of the hydro resources that the two countries shared in the section of the Paraná River starting from, and including, the Salto de Sete Quedas, to the Iguaçu River watershed. The treaty that gave origin to the power plant was signed in 1973.

The terms of the treaty, which expires in 2023, have been the subject of widespread discontent in Paraguay. The government of President Lugo vowed to renegotiate the terms of the treaty with Brazil, which long remained hostile to any renegotiation.

In 2009, Brazil agreed to a fairer payment of electricity to Paraguay and also allowed Paraguay to sell excess power directly to Brazilian companies instead of solely through the Brazilian electricity monopoly.

Construction starts 
In 1970, the consortium formed by the companies ELC Electroconsult S.p.A. (from Italy) and IECO (from the United States)  won the international competition for the realization of the viability studies and for the elaboration of the construction project. Design studies began in February 1971. On April 26, 1973, Brazil and Paraguay signed the Itaipu Treaty, the legal instrument for the hydroelectric exploitation of the Paraná River by the two countries. On May 17, 1974, the Itaipu Binacional entity was created to administer the plant's construction. The construction began in January of the following year. Brazil's (and Latin America's) first electric car was introduced in late 1974; it received the name Itaipu in honor of the project.

Paraná River rerouted 
On October 14, 1978, the Paraná River had its route changed, which allowed a section of the riverbed to dry so the dam could be built there.

Agreement by Brazil, Paraguay, and Argentina 
The construction of the dam was first contested by Argentina, but the negotiations and resolution of the dispute ended up setting the basis for Argentine–Brazilian integration later on.
An important diplomatic settlement was reached with the signing of the Acordo Tripartite by Brazil, Paraguay and Argentina, on October 19, 1979. This agreement established the allowed river levels and how much they could change as a result of the various hydroelectrical undertakings in the watershed that was shared by the three countries.

Formation of the lake 
The reservoir began its formation on October 13, 1982, when the dam works were completed and the side canal's gates were closed. Throughout this period, heavy rains and flooding accelerated the filling of the reservoir as the water rose  and reached the gates of the spillway on October 27.

Start of operations 
On May 5, 1984, the first generation unit started running in Itaipu. The first 18 units were installed at the rate of two to three a year; the last two of these started running in the year 1991.

Capacity expansion in 2007 

The last two of the 20 electric generation units started operations in September 2006 and in March 2007, thus raising the installed capacity to 14 GW and completing the power plant. This increase in capacity allows 18 generation units to run permanently while two are shut down for maintenance. Due to a clause in the treaty signed between Brazil, Paraguay and Argentina, the maximum number of generating units allowed to operate simultaneously cannot exceed 18 (see the agreement section for more information).

The rated nominal power of each generating unit (turbine and generator) is 700 MW. However, because the head (difference between reservoir level and the river level at the bottom of the dam) that actually occurs is higher than the designed head, the power available exceeds 750 MW half of the time for each generator.
Each turbine generates around 700 MW; by comparison, all the water from the Iguaçu Falls would have the capacity to feed only two generators.

November 2009 power failure 

On November 10, 2009, transmission from the plant was completely disrupted, possibly due to a storm damaging up to three high-voltage transmission lines. Itaipu itself was not damaged. This caused massive power outages in Brazil and Paraguay, blacking out the entire country of Paraguay for 15 minutes, and plunging Rio de Janeiro and São Paulo into darkness for more than 2 hours. 50 million people were reportedly affected. The blackout hit at 22:13 local time. It affected the southeast of Brazil most severely, leaving São Paulo, Rio de Janeiro and Espírito Santo completely without electricity. Blackouts also swept through the interior of Rio Grande do Sul, Santa Catarina, Mato Grosso do Sul, Mato Grosso, the interior of Bahia and parts of Pernambuco, energy officials said. By 00:30 power had been restored to most areas.

Wonder of the Modern World 
In 1994, the American Society of Civil Engineers elected the Itaipu Dam as one of the seven modern Wonders of the World. In 1995, the American magazine Popular Mechanics published the results.

Social and environmental impacts 
When construction of the dam began, approximately 10,000 families living beside the Paraná River were displaced because of construction.

The world's largest waterfall by volume, the Guaíra Falls, was inundated by the newly formed Itaipu reservoir. The Brazilian government later liquidated the Guaíra Falls National Park. A few months before the reservoir was filled, 80 people died when an overcrowded bridge overlooking the falls collapsed, as tourists sought a last glimpse of the falls.

The Guaíra Falls was an effective barrier that separated freshwater species in the upper Paraná basin (with its many endemics) from species found below it, and the two are recognized as different ecoregions. After the falls disappeared, many species formerly restricted to one of these areas have been able to invade the other, causing problems typically associated with introduced species. For example, more than 30 fish species that formerly were restricted to the region below the falls have been able to invade the region above.

The American composer Philip Glass has written a symphonic cantata named Itaipu, in honour of the structure.

The Santa Maria Ecological Corridor now connects the Iguaçu National Park with the protected margins of Lake Itaipu, and via these margins with the Ilha Grande National Park.

Statistics

Construction 
 The course of the seventh biggest river in the world was shifted, as were 50 million tonnes of earth and rock.
 The amount of concrete used to build the Itaipu Power Plant would be enough to build 210 football stadiums the size of the Estádio do Maracanã.
 The iron and steel used would allow for the construction of 380 Eiffel Towers.
 The volume of excavation of earth and rock in Itaipu is 8.5 times greater than that of the Channel Tunnel and the volume of concrete is 15 times greater.
 Around forty thousand people worked in the construction.
 Itaipu is one of the most expensive objects ever built.

Generating station and dam 
Itaipu is actually four dams joined together – from the far left, an earth fill dam, a rock fill dam, a concrete buttress main dam, and a concrete wing dam to the right.
It is equivalent to 40 times the average flow of the nearby natural Iguaçu Falls.
 The flow of two generators ( each) is roughly equivalent to the average flow of the Iguaçu Falls.
 Though it is the seventh largest reservoir in size in Brazil, the Itaipu's reservoir has the best relation between electricity production and flooded area. For the 14,000 MW installed power,  were flooded. The reservoirs for the hydroelectric power plants of Sobradinho Dam, Tucuruí Dam, Porto Primavera Dam, Balbina Dam, Serra da Mesa Dam and Furnas Dam are all larger than the one for Itaipu, but have a smaller installed generating capacity. The one with the next largest hydroelectric production, Tucuruí, has an installed capacity of 8,000 MW, while flooding  of land.
Electricity is 55% cheaper when made by the Itaipu Dam than the other types of power plants in the area.

Generation 

Although its designed peak generating capacity is only 14,000 MW, behind the 22,500 MW Three Gorges Dam, the dam formerly held the record for energy production with 101.6 TWh produced in 2016. This record was beaten in 2020, when the Three Gorges Dam produced a new record 111.8 TWh after extensive monsoon rainfall that year.

In the period 2012–2021, the Itaipu Dam maintained the second highest average annual hydroelectric production in the world averaging 89.22 TWh per year, second to the 97.22 TWh per year average of the Three Gorges Dam in that period.

See also 

 List of largest hydroelectric power stations
 List of largest power stations in the world
 List of conventional hydroelectric power stations
 List of dam megaprojects
 List of power stations in Brazil
 Megaproject
 Three Gorges Dam
 List of hydroelectric power station failures

References

External links 

 Itaipu Company Site 
 Introduction
 Power conversion
 Power conditioning
 The Itaipu Transmission System
 ELC-Electroconsult
 Voith-Siemens Hydro Power Generation, one of the hydro turbines and generators manufacturer for this project
 Article on Brazil`s Thermoelectric Priority Program Author`s updated contact information
 Panoramic – Itaipu Binacional – Foz do Iguaçu – Brazil 

Brazil–Paraguay border
Buttress dams
Dams completed in 1984
Dams in Paraguay
Dams in Paraná (state)
Dams on the Paraná River
Eletrobras
Energy infrastructure completed in 1984
Energy infrastructure completed in 1991
Foz do Iguaçu
Hernandarias District
Hydroelectric power stations in Paraguay
Hydroelectric power stations in Paraná (state)